Chris Goode may refer to:

 Chris Goode (American football) (born 1963)
 Chris Goode (cricketer) (born 1984)
 Chris Goode (playwright) (1973–2021), British playwright, theatre director and performer